Louis Radius (born 9 December 1979 in Suresnes) is a French Paralympic athlete. He represented France at the 2016 Summer Paralympics in Rio de Janeiro, Brazil and he won the bronze medal in the men's 1500 metres T38 event.

He won the silver medal twice in the men's 1500 metres T38 event at the World Championships, both in 2015 and in 2017.

He also competed at the European Championships in 2014, 2016 and 2018 and, in total, he won two gold medals and two silver medals.

Achievements

References

External links 

 
 

1979 births
Living people
Paralympic athletes of France
Paralympic bronze medalists for France
Athletes (track and field) at the 2016 Summer Paralympics
Athletes (track and field) at the 2020 Summer Paralympics
Medalists at the 2016 Summer Paralympics
Sportspeople from Suresnes
Paralympic medalists in athletics (track and field)
French male middle-distance runners
20th-century French people
21st-century French people
Université Laval alumni